

Transmission standards in use 
CAM-D
C-QUAM
Digital Radio Mondiale
HD Radio

List of Stations on Shortwave 
 
	_7330	DRM30	WINB		50000	0700-0930UTC
	_9265	DRM30	WINB		50000	0930-1130UTC
	15755	DRM30	WINB		50000	1130-1700UTC

List of Stations on Mediumwave 
 
	_540	CQUAM	WXYG		850
	_550	HDAM1	KFYI		5000
	_550	HDAM1	KTSA		5000
	_550	HDAM1	WBZS		1000
	_560	HDAM1	KLZ_		5000
	_560	HDAM1	WHYN		5000
	_560	HDAM1	WQAM		5000
	_560	HDAM1	WRDT		500
	_570	HDAM1	KLAC		5000
	_570	HDAM1	KLIF		5000
	_570	HDAM1	WWRC		5000
	_580	HDAM1	KMJ_		50000
	_580	HDAM1	WGAC		5000
	_580	HDAM1	WHP_		5000
	_580	HDAM1	WTAG		5000
	_590	HDAM1	KQNT		5000
	_590	CQUAM	WWLX		600
	_600	HDAM1	KOGO		5000
	_600	HDAM1	WBOB		5000
	_600	HDAM1	WCAO		5000
	_600	HDAM1	WMT_		5000
	_600	HDAM1	WREC		5000
	_610	CQUAM	KCSR		1000
	_610	HDAM1	KOJM		1000
	_610	HDAM1	WFNZ		5000
	_610	HDAM1	WTEL		5000
	_610	HDAM1	WTVN		5000
	_620	HDAM1	KTAR		5000
	_620	HDAM1	KTNO		5000
	_620	HDAM1	WDAE		10000
	_620	CQUAM	WKHB		5500
	_620	HDAM1	WTMJ		50000
	_630	CQUAM	CFCO		10000
	_630	HDAM1	KHOW		5000
	_630	HDAM1	WPRO		5000
	_630	HDAM1	WSBN		5000
	_640	HDAM1	KFI_		50000
	_640	HDAM1	KWPN		5000
	_640	HDAM1	WOI_		5000
	_640	HDAM1	WWJZ		50000
	_650	HDAM1	KENI		50000
	_650	HDAM1	KSTE		21400
	_650	HDAM3	WSRO		1500
	_660	HDAM1	WFAN		50000
	_670	HDAM1	KBOI		50000
	_670	HDAM1	KDLG		10000
	_670	HDAM1	KLTT		50000
	_670	HDAM1	WSCR		50000
	_680	HDAM1	KKYX		50000
	_690	HDAM1	WJOX		50000
	_700	CQUAM	WARB		1600
	_700	HDAM1	WLW_		50000
	_710	HDAM1	KSPN		50000
	_710	HDAM1	WOR_		50000
	_720	HDAM1	KDWN		50000
	_720	HDAM1	KOTZ		10000
	_720	HDAM1	WGN_		50000
	_730	HDAM1	KDBI		15000
	_730	HDAM1	KYYA		5000
	_730	CQUAM	WACE		5000
	_730	HDAM1	WTNT		8000
	_740	HDAM1	KBRT		50000
	_740	HDAM1	KCBS		50000
	_740	HDAM1	KVOR		3300
	_740	HDAM1	WDGY		2500
	_740	CQUAM	WJIB		250
	_740	HDAM1	WSBR		2500
	_750	CQUAM	CKJH		25000
	_750	HDAM1	KOAL		10000
	_750	HDAM1	WSB_		50000
	_760	HDAM1	KDFD		50000
	_760	HDAM1	KTKR		50000
	_760	HDAM1	WJR_		50000
	_770	CQUAM	CHQR		50000
	_770	HDAM1	KAAM		10000
	_770	HDAM1	KCBC		50000
	_770	HDAM1	KCHU		9750
	_770	HDAM1	WABC		50000
	_770	CQUAM	WLWL		5000
	_770	HDAM1	WWCN		10000
	_780	HDAM1	WBBM		42000
	_790	HDAM1	KABC		5000
	_790	HDAM1	KBME		5000
	_790	HDAM1	WPRV		5000
	_790	HDAM1	WQXI		28000
	_800	CQUAM	KINY		10000
	_800	HDAM1	WNNW		3000
	_810	HDAM1	KGO_		50000
	_810	HDAM1	KLVZ		2200
	_810	HDAM1	WGY_		50000
	_820	HDAM1	KUTR		50000
	_820	HDAM1	WBAP		50000
	_820	HDAM1	WNYC		10000
	_820	HDAM1	WVSG		5000
	_820	HDAM1	WWBA		50000
	_820	HDAM3	WWFD		4300
	_830	HDAM1	KLAA		50000
	_830	HDAM1	KSDP		1000
	_830	HDAM1	WCCO		50000
	_830	CQUAM	WMMI		1000
	_840	HDAM1	KXNT		50000
	_840	HDAM1	WHAS		50000
	_850	HDAM1	KFUO		5000
	_850	HDAM1	KHHO		10000
	_850	HDAM1	KOA_		50000
	_850	HDAM1	WXJC		50000
	_860	HDAM1	KMVP		940
	_860	HDAM1	KONO		5000
	_860	HDAM1	WAEC		5000
	_860	HDAM1	WWDB		10000
	_870	HDAM1	WKAR		10000
	_880	CQUAM	CHQT		50000
	_880	HDAM1	WCBS		50000
	_890	HDAM1	KBBI		10000
	_890	HDAM1	WLS_		50000
	_900	CQUAM	WKDA		5000
	_910	HDAM1	KGME		5000
	_910	HDAM1	KIYU		5000
	_910	HDAM1	KKSF		20000
	_910	HDAM1	KPOF		5000
	_910	HDAM1	KWDZ		5000
	_910	HDAM1	WFDF		50000
	_910	HDAM1	WRNL		5000
	_910	HDAM1	WSUI		5000
	_920	HDAM1	KARN		5000
	_920	HDAM1	WBAA		5000
	_920	CQUAM	WGOL		1000
	_920	HDAM1	WHJJ		5000
	_920	HDAM1	WOKY		5000
	_930	CQUAM	KKIN		2500
	_930	HDAM1	KNSA		2500
	_930	HDAM1	WFXJ		5000
	_930	HDAM1	WLBL		5000
	_930	HDAM1	WPKX		5000
	_940	HDAM1	WIPR		10000
	_940	CQUAM	WYLD		10000
	_950	HDAM1	KCAP		5000
	_950	HDAM1	KKSE		5000
	_950	HDAM1	KPRC		5000
	_950	HDAM1	WKDN		43000
	_950	HDAM1	WWJ_		50000
	_950	HDAM1	WXGI		3900
	_950	HDAM1	XEKAM		20000
	_960	HDAM1	KNEW		5000
	_960	HDAM1	WELI		5000
	_960	HDAM1	WERC		5000
	_970	HDAM1	KESP		1000
	_970	HDAM1	WFLA		25000
	_970	HDAM1	WHA_		5000
	_970	HDAM1	XEEZ		5000
	_980	HDAM1	KFWB		5000
	_980	HDAM1	WHSR		5000
	_980	HDAM1	WOFX		5000
	_980	HDAM1	WONE		5000
	_980	HDAM1	WTEM		50000
	_990	HDAM1	KATD		10000
	_990	HDAM1	WDCX		5000
	_990	HDAM1	WMYM		5000
	_990	HDAM1	WTLN		50000
	1000	HDAM1	KTOK		5000
	1000	HDAM1	WMVP		50000
	1010	HDAM1	WINS		50000
	1010	HDAM1	WOLB		1000
	1020	HDAM1	KDKA		50000
	1020	HDAM1	KTNQ		50000
	1030	CQUAM	KDUN		50000
	1030	HDAM1	WBZ_		50000
	1040	HDAM1	KCBR		15000
	1040	HDAM1	WHO_		50000
	1050	HDAM1	KTCT		50000
	1060	HDAM1	KYW_		50000
	1070	HDAM1	KNX_		50000
	1070	HDAM1	WAPI		50000
	1070	HDAM1	WDIA		50000
	1070	HDAM1	WFNI		50000
	1070	HDAM1	WNCT		10000
	1070	HDAM1	WTSO		10000
	1080	HDAM1	KRLD		50000
	1080	CQUAM	KYMO		500
	1080	CQUAM	WOAP		1000
	1080	HDAM1	WTIC		50000
	1090	HDAM1	KMXA		50000
	1090	HDAM1	WILD		4800
	1090	CQUAM	WKTE		1000
	1100	HDAM1	WTAM		50000
	1100	HDAM1	WWWE		5000
	1110	HDAM1	KDIS		50000
	1110	HDAM1	KFAB		50000
	1110	HDAM1	WBT_		50000
	1120	HDAM1	KMOX		50000
	1130	HDAM1	KTLK		50000
	1130	HDAM1	WDFN		50000
	1130	HDAM1	WISN		50000
	1140	HDAM1	KHTK		50000
	1140	HDAM1	WRVA		50000
	1140	HDAM1	WVEL		5000
	1160	HDAM1	KRDY		10000
	1160	HDAM1	KSL_		50000
	1160	HDAM1	KVCE		35000
	1170	HDAM1	KFAQ		50000
	1170	HDAM1	KLOK		50000
	1170	CQUAM	KYET		6000
	1170	HDAM1	WWVA		50000
	1180	HDAM1	WHAM		50000
	1190	HDAM1	KEX_		50000
	1190	HDAM1	KPHN		5000
	1190	HDAM1	WOWO		50000
	1200	HDAM1	WCHB		50000
	1200	HDAM1	WOAI		50000
	1200	HDAM1	WRTO		10000
	1210	CQUAM	KGYN		10000
	1210	HDAM1	WLRO		10000
	1210	HDAM1	WPHT		50000
	1220	HDAM1	KLDC		660
	1220	CQUAM	WATX		1000
	1220	CQUAM	WSLM		5000
	1220	HDAM1	WZBK		1000
	1230	HDAM1	KDIX		1000
	1230	HDAM1	KOY_		1000
	1230	HDAM1	KSJK		1000
	1230	CQUAM	WBLQ		1000
	1230	HDAM1	WCWA		1000
	1230	HDAM1	WECK		1000
	1230	HDAM3	WFAS		1000
	1230	HDAM1	WJBC		1000
	1230	HDAM1	WJOI		627
	1230	CQUAM	WNNC		1000
	1230	HDAM1	WTKG		1000
	1230	HDAM1	WYTS		1000
	1240	HDAM1	KDSK		1000
	1240	CQUAM	KJAA		1000
	1240	HDAM1	KJCR		1000
	1240	HDAM1	WBAS		1000
	1240	HDAM1	WHVN		1000
	1240	HDAM1	WMMB		1000
	1240	CQUAM	WPAX		1000
	1240	HDAM1	WTAX		1000
	1250	HDAM1	KKDZ		5000
	1250	HDAM1	KWSU		5000
	1250	HDAM1	WHNZ		25000
	1250	HDAM1	WPGP		5000
	1260	HDAM1	WBIX		5000
	1260	HDAM1	WCCR		10000
	1260	HDAM1	WNDE		5000
	1260	HDAM1	WSDZ		20000
	1260	HDAM1	WSUA		50000
	1260	HDAM1	WWVT		5000
	1260	HDAM1	WYDE		5000
	1270	HDAM1	KFLC		50000
	1270	HDAM1	WCGC		10000
	1270	CAM-D	WKBF		5000
	1270	HDAM1	WXYT		50000
	1280	HDAM1	KWSX		1000
	1280	HDAM1	WADO		50000
	1280	HDAM1	WHTK		5000
	1290	HDAM1	KCUB		1000
	1290	CQUAM	KRGE		5000
	1290	HDAM1	WDZY		25000
	1290	HDAM1	WPVD		10000
	1290	HDAM1	WWTX		2500
	1300	HDAM1	KAKC		5000
	1300	HDAM1	KCSF		5000
	1300	CQUAM	KHTW		2170
	1300	HDAM1	KPMO		5000
	1300	HDAM1	WAVZ		1000
	1300	HDAM1	WRDZ		4500
	1310	HDAM1	KMKY		5000
	1310	HDAM1	KTCK		9000
	1310	CQUAM	WEMG		1000
	1310	HDAM1	WGSP		1000
	1310	HDAM1	WIBA		5000
	1310	CQUAM	WOKR		1000
	1310	HDAM1	WTLC		5000
	1320	CQUAM	KCLI		1000
	1330	CQUAM	KGAK		5000
	1330	HDAM1	KJPR		1000
	1330	HDAM1	KKPZ		5000
	1340	HDAM1	KCBL		1000
	1340	HDAM1	KDCO		1000
	1340	HDAM1	KUOW		1000
	1340	CQUAM	KIKO		1000
	1340	CQUAM	KXEO		960
	1340	CQUAM	WBBT		1000
	1340	HDAM1	WEXL		1000
	1340	HDAM1	WHAT		1000
	1340	CQUAM	WIRY		1000
	1340	HDAM1	WIZE		1000
	1350	HDAM1	WARF		5000
	1350	CQUAM	WINY		5000
	1350	HDAM1	WMMV		1000
	1360	HDAM1	WSAI		5000
	1370	CQUAM	KFRO		1000
	1370	CQUAM	KSUM		1000
	1370	HDAM1	WSPD		5000
	1380	HDAM1	KMUS		7000
	1380	HDAM1	KRKO		34000
	1380	HDAM1	WPLA		1000
	1380	HDAM1	WWMI		5000
	1390	HDAM1	KGNU		5000
	1390	HDAM1	WGRB		5000
	1390	HDAM1	WNIO		9500
	1390	CQUAM	WZZB		1000
	1400	HDAM1	KTUC		1000
	1400	HDAM1	WCOS		1000
	1400	HDAM1	WGIN		1000
	1400	HDAM1	WJLD		1000
	1400	HDAM1	WWIN		500
	1430	CQUAM	KALV		500
	1430	HDAM1	KTBZ		25000
	1430	CQUAM	WION		4700
	1430	HDAM1	WKOX		5000
	1430	HDAM1	WYGI		15000
	1430	CQUAM	WRDN		2000
	1440	HDAM1	KFOO		1000
	1440	CQUAM	KVON		5000
	1440	HDAM1	KYCR		5000
	1450	CQUAM	KBPS		1000
	1450	HDAM1	KMRY		1000
	1450	HDAM1	KRZY		1000
	1450	HDAM1	KTZR		1000
	1450	CQUAM	KWHW		668
	1450	HDAM1	WBYU		1000
	1450	CQUAM	WCJU		1000
	1450	HDAM1	WILM		1000
	1450	CQUAM	WIOE		1000
	1450	HDAM1	WOL_		1000
	1450	HDAM1	WSDV		1000
	1440	CQUAM	KRRS		1000
	1460	HDAM1	KXNO		5000
	1460	HDAM1	WOPG		5000
	1460	HDAM1	WTKT		5000
	1470	HDAM1	KIID		5000
	1470	HDAM3	WMGG		2800
	1470	HDAM1	WSAN		5000
	1470	HDAM1	WWNN		50000
	1480	HDAM1	WDAS		5000
	1480	HDAM1	WGFY		4400
	1480	HDAM1	WSLI		2000
	1480	HDAM1	WKGC		500
	1490	HDAM1	KCFC		1000
	1490	HDAM1	WBAE		1000
	1490	CQUAM	WIKE		1000
	1490	HDAM1	WOLF		1000
	1490	HDAM1	WPCI		1000
	1490	CQUAM	WPCI		1000
	1500	HDAM1	WFED		50000
	1510	HDAM1	WLAC		50000
	1520	HDAM1	KKXA		50000
	1530	HDAM1	KFBK		50000
	1530	HDAM1	KQSC		15000
	1530	HDAM1	WCKY		50000
	1540	HDAM1	WDCD		50000
	1550	HDAM1	WSDK		5000
	1560	HDAM1	WFME		50000
	1570	HDAM1	KCVR		5000
	1580	HDAM1	KQFN		50000
	1580	CAM-D	WSRF		10000
	1580	CQUAM	WZKY		1000
	1590	HDAM1	KMIC		5000
	1600	HDAM1	KATZ		5000
	1600	HDAM1	KEPN		5000
	1600	CAM-D	KPNP		5000
	1600	HDAM1	KXEW		1000
	1600	HDAM1	WATX		1000
	1600	HDAM1	WPOM		5000
	1620	HDAM1	WTAW		10000
	1630	HDAM1	WRDW		10000
	1640	HDAM1	KDZR		10000
	1640	HDAM1	WSJP		10000
	1660	CQUAM	KQWB		10000
	1660	CQUAM	KSVE		8500
	1660	CQUAM	WTOU		10000
	1690	HDAM1	KDMT		10000
	1690	HDAM1	WVON		10000
	1700	HDAM1	KKLF		10000
	1700	HDAM1	WRCR		10000

External sources 
Topaz Designs
DRMRX
Meduci
FCC
Multistandard Mediumwave Receivers

Lists of radio stations